Kenya competed at the 1984 Summer Paralympics in Stoke Mandeville, Great Britain and New York City, United States.

Team 
Kenya made their third Paralympic Games appearance in Stoke Mandeville, Great Britain and New York City, United States.  Their delegation included 13 sportspeople, 11 men and 2 women.

Medalists 
13 competitors from Kenya won 3 medals, one of each colour, and finished 34th in the medal table.

See also 
 Kenya at the Paralympics
 Kenya at the 1984 Summer Olympics

References 

Nations at the 1984 Summer Paralympics
1984
Paralympics